Bates v Post Office Ltd (No 3) [2019] EWHC 606 (QB) is a part judgment (1 of 6), made in the group litigation order case of Bates & Others v Post Office Ltd, an English contract law case, concerning the term of good faith and the British Post Office scandal.

Facts
550 sub-postmasters and others claimed that the Post Office’s Horizon software system for sales and accounting was defective and threw up accounting shortfalls for which the Post Office then wrongly held them accountable. They argued this was a breach of contract, and good faith. The Post Office argued that the claimants were responsible for the shortfalls. This represented actual money missing, and brought many prosecutions, culminating in the British Post Office scandal.

Judgment
In the High Court, Fraser J, held there was a relational contract with a duty of good faith, fair dealing and transparency in the terms on liability, payment, termination and suspension in the contract. Some provisions were too unusual and onerous to be incorporated without being drawn specially to the other party’s attention. Twenty-nine bugs, errors and defects were identified and analysed in the Horizon software.

Referring to the legal textbook Chitty on Contracts, Fraser J said the following.

See also

English contract law
UK enterprise law

Notes

References

English contract case law